William Dunning (2 January 1865 – 1902) was a Scottish footballer who played in the Football League for Aston Villa.

References

1872 births
1902 deaths
Scottish footballers
English Football League players
Association football goalkeepers
Johnstone F.C. players
Celtic F.C. players
Bootle F.C. (1879) players
Aston Villa F.C. players